The Kremna Prophecies or Prophecy from Kremna are a collection of prophecies purporting to have been written before the twentieth-century events that they describe.

Origin
The Kremna Prophecies originated in the village of Kremna, in Serbia. Illiterate villager Miloš Tarabić (Милош Тарабић) and his nephew Mitar Tarabić (Митар Тарабић, 1829-1899) built a reputation for predicting the future. Their village Serbian Orthodox priest, Zaharije Zaharić (Захарије Захарић, 1836-1918) is said to have recorded their predictions. Both Tarabićes died before 1900.

Evaluation
At least one author has questioned whether the "accurate" prophecies were published in advance of the events they foretell: Voja Antonić (in Serbian) in Kremansko neproročanstvo: studija jedne obmane (Non-Prophecy from Kremna - a study of deception).

References 

All references are dubious, no real reference is provided to confirm the validity of any statement.

External links 
JAH - Prophesy of Mitar Tarabic (Full text available, with comments)

Apocalypticism
Divination
Prophecy
Serbian folklore